Erzin is a rural locality (a selo) and the administrative center of Erzinsky District of Tuva, Russia. Population:

Climate

References

Notes

Sources

Rural localities in Tuva